The Rwanda Davis Cup team represents Rwanda in Davis Cup tennis competition and are governed by the Fédération Rwandaise de Tennis.

Rwanda currently compete in the Europe/Africa Zone of Group III.  They finished second in Group B of Group IV in 2005.

History
Rwanda competed in its first Davis Cup in 2001.

Current team (2022) 

 Bertin Karenzi
 Ernest Habiyambere
 Etienne Niyigena
 Joshua Muhire
 Junior Hakizumwami (Junior player)

See also
Davis Cup

External links

Davis Cup teams
Davis Cup
Davis Cup
2001 establishments in Rwanda
Sports clubs established in 2001